James Grabowski (born September 9, 1944) is a former American football player and broadcaster.  He played college football at the University of Illinois and professionally in the National Football League (NFL) for the Green Bay Packers and the Chicago Bears.  He was an analyst on Illinois football radio broadcasts for nearly 30 years, retiring after the 2006 season.

Collegiate playing career
Grabowski entered the University of Illinois in 1962, out of Taft High School in Chicago.  At Illinois, Grabowski was a star running back, and was named Associated Press All-American in both 1964 and 1965.  As a sophomore in 1963, Grabowski was named Most Valuable Player of the Rose Bowl, after leading the Fighting Illini to a 17–7 comeback victory over the Washington Huskies. Grabowski received many awards and recognitions after his senior season in 1965, including finishing third in the Heisman Trophy voting, being named The Sporting News co-player of the year and Back of the Year by the Washington Touchdown Club, and receiving the Chicago Tribune Silver Football as the Big Ten Conference Most Valuable Player.  He finished as the all-time leader in rushing yards in Big Ten history.  Grabowski was also an outstanding student at the University of Illinois, having been named GTE Academic All-American in 1964 and 1965, and graduated with a degree in finance in 1966.

Grabowski is a member of the College Football Hall of Fame, inducted in 1995.  He was also inducted into the GTE Academic All-American Hall of Fame and the Rose Bowl Hall of Fame.  Additionally, Grabowski was named to the University of Illinois "All-Century" team, and is a member of the National Polish-American Sports Hall of Fame.

1963: 141 carries for 616 yards and 7 TD. 3 catches for 21 yards.
1964: 186 carries for 1004 yards and 10 TD. 9 catches for 101 yards.
1965: 252 carries for 1258 yards and 7 TD. 3 catches for 22 yards.

Professional playing career
Grabowski was selected in the first round of the 1966 NFL draft by the Green Bay Packers, with the ninth overall selection, held on November 27th, 1965, only a week after his college playing career ended.  (Grabowski was also taken as the first overall pick in the AFL draft, by the expansion Miami Dolphins.)  Grabowski played five seasons for the Packers, and was known as one of Green Bay's "Gold Dust Twins" (along with fellow rookie running back Donny Anderson) in the late Sixties.

After he gained the starting position in 1967, a series of injuries hampered his career.  He was the Packers leading rusher in 1967 with 466 yards, while also catching 12 passes for 171, but a late-season injury forced him to miss the postseason, including their win in Super Bowl II.    With a new head coach in 1971, Grabowski was waived by Green Bay in August, picked up by the Chicago Bears for the season, and retired in training camp in September 1972. Over his six seasons in the NFL, Grabowski rushed for 1,731 yards and scored 12 touchdowns, 8 rushing, 3 receiving, and one after a fumble by Mel Renfro which he returned for an 18-yard score in the 1966 NFL Championship Game versus the Dallas Cowboys.

References

External links

1944 births
Living people
American football running backs
Arena football announcers
Chicago Bears players
Green Bay Packers players
Illinois Fighting Illini football players
United States Football League announcers
All-American college football players
American Football League first overall draft picks
Sportspeople from Chicago
Players of American football from Chicago
American people of Polish descent
College Football Hall of Fame inductees